The 2022 Mercer Tennis Classic was a professional tennis tournament played on outdoor hard courts. It was the tenth edition of the tournament which was part of the 2022 ITF Women's World Tennis Tour. It took place in Macon, Georgia, United States between 17 and 23 October 2022.

Champions

Singles

  Madison Brengle def.  Panna Udvardy, 6–3, 6–1

Doubles

  Anna Rogers /  Christina Rosca def.  Madison Brengle /  Maria Mateas, 6–4, 6–4

Singles main draw entrants

Seeds

 1 Rankings are as of 10 October 2022.

Other entrants
The following players received wildcards into the singles main draw:
  Samantha Crawford
  Riley Crowder
  Anna Rogers
  Katrina Scott

The following player received entry into the singles main draw using a protected ranking:
  Maria Mateas

The following players received entry from the qualifying draw:
  Carolyn Ansari
  Ariana Arseneault
  Bianca Fernandez
  Victoria Hu
  Olivia Lincer
  Victoria Osuigwe
  Alana Smith
  Lisa Zaar

The following players received as lucky losers:
  Tamara Barad Itzhaki
  Salma Ewing
  Akasha Urhobo

References

External links
 2022 Mercer Tennis Classic at ITFtennis.com
 Official website

2022 ITF Women's World Tennis Tour
2022 in American tennis
October 2022 sports events in the United States